Rodolfo González (born 1 February 1967) is an Argentine professional golfer.

González was born in Buenos Aires. He worked as a caddie in Ranelagh Golf Club, Buenos Aires, before turning professional in 1989. 

González won the Argentine Tour Ranking in 1999. He competed on the Challenge Tour from 2005 to 2009 and his best finishes were third place in the Costa Rica Open in 2005, fourth in the Guatemala Open in 2007 and the Argentine Open 2008. He also competed on the European Tour in 2000 and 2006-08.

González represented Argentina on one occasion in the qualifying World Cup, in 2008.

In 2003 he won the Argentine Open.

Professional wins (14)

Tour de las Américas wins (1)

TPG Tour wins (1)

Ángel Cabrera Tour wins (1)
2015 Fecha 2

Other wins (11)
1996 Buenos Aires Golf Club Grand Prix
1999 South Open, Norpatagonico Open
2000 Ranelagh Open
2002 Abierto del Litoral
2003 Argentine Open
2004 Norpatagonico Open
2005 South Open
2006 Norpatagonico Open, Roberto de Vicenzo Classic
2007 Angel Cabrera Classic Pro-Am (with Ricardo Smith)

External links

Argentine male golfers
European Tour golfers
Sportspeople from Buenos Aires
1967 births
Living people